Ward 5 York South—Weston is a municipal electoral division in Toronto, Ontario that has been represented in the Toronto City Council since the 2018 municipal election. It was last contested in 2022, with Frances Nunziata elected councillor for the 2018–2022 term.

History 
The ward was created in 2018 when the provincial government aligned Toronto's then-44 municipal wards with the 25 corresponding provincial and federal ridings. The current ward is an amalgamation of the old Ward 11 (western section), the old Ward 12 (eastern section).

2018 municipal election 
Ward 5 York South—Weston was first contested during the 2018 municipal election. Ward-12 incumbent Frank Di Giorgio, who served as budget chief under former mayor Rob Ford ran against Ward 11 incumbent and council speaker Frances Nunziata, and nine other candidates. Nunziata was ultimately elected with 44.55 per cent of the vote.

2022 municipal election 
In 2022, Nunziata narrowly secured re-election in a tightly-contested race against progressive candidate Chiara Padovani, who was endorsed by Progress Toronto and the Toronto & York Region Labour Council. Nunziata prevailed over Padovani by a margin of 94 votes.

Geography 
York South—Weston is part of the Etobicoke/York community council.

The ward is largely made up of what was the former city of York prior to Metro Toronto's 1998 amalgamation. It is bordered to the west by the Humber River and the east by a Canadian National Railway track. The north boundary is Highway 401 and the south boundary is a Canadian Pacific Railway track.

Councillors

Election results

See also 

 Municipal elections in Canada
 Municipal government of Toronto
 List of Toronto municipal elections

References

External links 

 Councillor's webpage

Toronto city council wards
2018 establishments in Ontario